Professor Julian Taylor, C.B.E., M.S., F.R.C.S., Hon.F.R.A.C.S. (26 January 1889 – 15 April 1961) was a specialist in neurological surgery, Senior Surgeon at University College Hospital, a former  vice-president of the Royal College of Surgeons and later Professor of Surgery at the University of Khartoum.
 
Born in St. John's Wood, London, his father was the artist Edward Ingram Taylor and his mother, Margaret Boole, came from a family of mathematicians (his aunt was Alicia Boole Stott and his grandfather was George Boole). His brother was the physicist Sir Geoffrey Ingram Taylor OM. Educated at University College School and University College Hospital, he qualified in 1911, an immediate disciple of Wilfred Trotter, one of the pioneers in neurosurgery, graduated M.B., B.S., with honours in medicine in the following year and took the F.R.C.S. in 1914.

References
British Medical Journal obituary
Sudan Association of Surgeons

External links
Mycetoma Research Centre, Sudan
Memorial address by Mr. A. J. Gardham, F.R.C.S

English surgeons
Commanders of the Order of the British Empire
1889 births
1961 deaths
People educated at University College School
Fellows of the Royal College of Surgeons
Academic staff of the University of Khartoum
20th-century surgeons